Mary Katherine Linaker (July 19, 1913 – April 18, 2008) was an American actress and screenwriter who appeared in many B movies during the 1930s and 1940s, most notably Kitty Foyle (1940) starring Ginger Rogers. Linaker used her married name, Kate Phillips, as a screenwriter, notably for the cult movie hit The Blob (1958). She is credited with coining the name "The Blob" for the movie, which was originally titled "The Molten Meteor".

Biography
Linaker was born in  Pine Bluff, Arkansas and graduated from a private school in Connecticut and from New York University. She went on to attend the American Academy of Dramatic Arts.

Linaker acted in supporting roles on Broadway before signing a film contract with Warner Bros. She was signed by the studio after a talent scout saw her in Jackson White at the Providencetown Theater. Her Broadway credits included Every Man for Himself (1940), and Yesterday's Orchids (1934). She briefly changed her name to Lynn Acker "for screen purposes", but she soon dropped that name. Most of her film work had her in limited roles, with her one leading role coming in The Girl from Mandalay (1936). Her screen debut was in From this Dark Stairway (1935).

Linaker wrote for the Voice of America during World War II in addition to working for the Red Cross.

She later taught in the film studies department at Keene State College in New Hampshire from 1980 to 2006.

From the 1960s to her death, Linaker dedicated much of her time supporting the children at Hampshire Country School in Rindge, New Hampshire. Linaker volunteered countless hours over the many years as English teacher and drama coach at the very small private school for twice exceptional children whose alumni include Temple Grandin.

Personal life
Linaker – on June 9, 1953, in Bedford, New York – married Howard Baron Phillips (1909–1985), who initially was a baritone and writer but later worked as an executive with NBC television. In December 1936, for about a year, Phillips sang with Ray Noble under the pseudonym Howard Barrie.
 See "I've Got My Love to Keep Me Warm"

Death
On April 18, 2008, Linaker died in Keene, New Hampshire.

Partial filmography 

 The Murder of Dr. Harrigan (1936) - Sally Keating
 Road Gang (1936) - Barbara Winston
 The Girl from Mandalay (1936) - Jeanie Barton
 Easy Money (1936) - Carol Carter
 Crack-Up (1936) - Mrs. Fleming
 The Outer Gate (1937) - Lois Borden
 Black Aces (1937) - Sandy McKenzie
 Charlie Chan at Monte Carlo (1937) - Joan Karnoff
 Personal Secretary (1938) - Flo Sampson
 The Last Warning (1938) - Carla Rodriguez
 I Am a Criminal (1938) - Linda La Rue
 Trade Winds (1938) - Grace (uncredited)
 Young Mr. Lincoln (1939) - Mrs. Edwards (uncredited)
 Charlie Chan in Reno (1939) - Mrs. Russell
 Man About Town (1939) - Receptionist (uncredited)
 Hotel for Women (1939) - Jane (uncredited)
 Girl from Rio (1939) - Vicki
 Charlie Chan at Treasure Island (1939) - Egyptian Princess Ectoplasm (uncredited)
 Drums Along the Mohawk (1939) - Mrs. Demooth
 Heaven with a Barbed Wire Fence (1939) - NurseHidden Enemy (1940) - Sonia Manning
 Green Hell (1940) - Woman in Cafe (uncredited)
 Free, Blonde and 21 (1940) - Mrs. John Crane
 Buck Benny Rides Again (1940) - Brenda Tracy
 Charlie Chan's Murder Cruise (1940) - Mrs. Pendleton
 Sandy Is a Lady (1940) - Mrs. Porter, Writer's Wife
 Mystery Sea Raider (1940) - Flossie La Mare
 Kitty Foyle (1940) - Veronica Strafford
 The Invisible Woman (1940) - Showroom Buyer (uncredited)
 They Dare Not Love (1941) - Barbara Murdock
 Blood and Sand (1941) - Guest of Doña Sol (uncredited)
 Charlie Chan in Rio (1941) - Helen Ashby
 Private Nurse (1941) - Helene
 Married Bachelor (1941) - Minor Role (uncredited)
 Moon Over Her Shoulder (1941) - Radio Hostess (uncredited)
 Cadet Girl (1941) - Minor Role (scenes deleted)
 Glamour Boy (1941) - Mrs. Emily Colder
 Remember the Day (1941) - Society Reporter (uncredited)
 A Close Call for Ellery Queen (1942) - Margo Rogers
 The Night Before the Divorce (1942) - Hedda Smythe
 Men of Texas (1942) - Mrs. Sarah Olsen
 Orchestra Wives (1942) - Margie (uncredited)
 War Dogs (1942) - Joan Allen
 Pittsburgh (1942) - Secretary (uncredited)
 Happy Go Lucky (1943) - Suzanne (uncredited)
 Cinderella Swings It (1943) - Madame Dolores
 Two Weeks to Live (1943) - Mrs. Madge Carmen
 The More the Merrier (1943) - Miss Allen (uncredited)
 Let's Face It (1943) - Canteen Hostess (uncredited)
 Wintertime (1943) - Wife (uncredited)
 Lady in the Dark (1944) - Liza's Mother
 Men on Her Mind (1944) - Eloise Palmer
 It Happened Tomorrow (1944) - Anniversary Party Attendee (uncredited)
 Laura (1944) - Woman (uncredited)
 Here Come the Waves (1944) - Pretty Woman (uncredited)
 Bring On the Girls'' (1945) - Commander's Wife (uncredited) (final film role)

References

Further reading

External links
 
 

1913 births
2008 deaths
People from Pine Bluff, Arkansas
American film actresses
American women screenwriters
New York University alumni
Warner Bros. contract players
20th-century American actresses
People from Keene, New Hampshire
Screenwriters from Arkansas
Screenwriters from New Hampshire
20th-century American women writers
20th-century American screenwriters
21st-century American women